The Sorrows of Satan is a 1917 British silent fantasy film directed by Alexander Butler and starring Gladys Cooper, Owen Nares and Cecil Humphreys. It was made at Isleworth Studios. It was based on the 1895 novel of the same name by Marie Corelli (1855-1924). The plot involves a poverty-stricken author who is so depressed about his life that he agrees to sell his soul to the Devil.

The Devil was depicted as a sympathetic character in the novel on which this film is based, having begged for forgiveness from God who cruelly refuses him, thus making the blockbuster novel a topic of controversy when it was published.
This film version does not follow the novel that closely, with Satan appearing as a handsome, wealthy prince. Christopher Workman opines "Despite being terribly unoriginal, the film....was by all accounts commercially successful".  It was remade in 1926 by Paramount, directed by D. W. Griffith.

Cast
 Gladys Cooper as Lady Sybil Elton 
 Owen Nares as Geoffrey Tempest  
 Cecil Humphreys as Prince Ramirez 
 Lionel d'Aragon as Earl Eaton  
 Winifred Delavente as Diana Chesney  
 Alice De Winton
 Minna Grey

References

Bibliography
 Harris, Ed. Britain's Forgotten Film Factory: The Story of Isleworth Studios. Amberley Publishing, 2013.

External links

1917 films
1910s fantasy films
British silent feature films
British fantasy films
Films based on works by Marie Corelli
Films directed by Alexander Butler
Films shot at Isleworth Studios
British black-and-white films
1910s English-language films
1910s British films